BG Indi, also known as κ1 Indi (Kappa1 Indi) is a multiple star system in the southern constellation of Indus. Its average apparent magnitude is 6.141, meaning it can only be seen by the naked eye under exceptionally good viewing conditions. Stellar parallax measurements by Gaia put the system at about 166 light-years (51 parsecs) away.

Nomenclature
The star system is most commonly known as BG Indi. BG Indi is its variable star designation, a unique name given to variable stars based on its constellation and when it was discovered to be a variable. It also has the name κ1 Indi (Latinized to Kappa1 Indi), which is its Bayer designation.

Properties
BG Indi consists of four stars in two compact, orbiting pairs. The brighter pair is known as BG Indi A, and consists of two F-type main-sequence stars Aa and Ab. As F-type stars, they are more massive, larger, and hotter than the Sun, and with a metallicity of −0.2 ± 0.1, it is less metal-rich than the Sun. BG Indi is about 2.65 billion years old, and is just starting to leave the main sequence.

BG Indi Aa and Ab orbit each other on a circular orbit, with a period of 1.46 days. Periodically, one star passes in front of the other, blocking its light. Therefore, the apparent magnitude varies from 6.11 to 6.36. Its status as an eclipsing binary was confirmed by J. Manfroid and G. Mathys in 1984.

The other two stars, BG Indi Ba and Bb, form the pair BG Indi B. Both are less massive than the Sun, and orbit each other on a tighter orbit with a period of 0.53 days. Collectively, BG Indi A and B orbit each other with a period of 720.9 days with a moderate eccentricity of 0.209. All three orbits are likely to be more or less coplanar. BG Indi is the nearest quadruple star system consisting of two eclipsing binaries.

Notes

References

Indi, Kappa1
Algol variables
Indus (constellation)
Eclipsing binaries
F-type main-sequence stars
8369
208496
108478
Durchmusterung objects
4
Indi, BG